The 1987–88 Marquette Warriors men's basketball team represented Marquette University during the 1987–88 men's college basketball season. The Warriors finished the regular season with a record of 10–18. This was also their final season playing at MECCA Arena.

Schedule

External links
MUScoop's MUWiki

References 

Marquette
Marquette Golden Eagles men's basketball seasons
Marq
Marq